Hemchandra Barua (Hêmsôndrô Bôruwa), also known as Hem Barua was a  prominent writer, social reformer  of Assamese of the 19th century. He hailed from Sibsagar District of Assam.  His father was Muktaram Barua.

Literacy works
He was the compiler of the first exhaustive Assamese dictionary Hemkosh, where spellings based on Sanskrit were first introduced. It was the second dictionary of the Assamese language. It was published in 1900 after his death under the supervision of Capt. P. R. Gordon, ISC and Hemchandra Goswami.

Some of his other works are listed below:
 'Ôxômiya Byakôrôn' (Assamese grammar) (অসমীয়া ব্যাকৰণ) (1859)
 'Adipath' (আদিপাঠ) (1873)
 'Pathmala' (পাঠ-মালা) (1882)
 'Ôxômiya lôrar byakôrôn' (Grammar for Assamese children) (অসমীয়া ল’ৰাৰ ব্যাকৰণ) (1886). All the above four books were accepted as text books for schools and also awarded by the British Government.
 'Pôrhaxôliya Ôbhidhan' (School Dictionary) (পঢ়াশলীয়া অভিধান) (1892)
 'Bahirê rông sông, bhitôrê kûwabhaturi', (বাহিৰে ৰংচং ভিতৰে কোৱাভাতুৰী)
 'Kaniyar Kirttôn' (কানীয়াৰ কীৰ্ত্তন) (1861)
 'Swasthyô rôkhya ba ga bhalê rakhibôr upay' (Way to health) (স্বাস্থ্য ৰক্ষা বা গা ভালে ৰাখিবৰ উপায়) (translated)
 'Assamese Marriage System'
He was also an editor of Assam News published from Gauhati (1883–85).

See also
 Assamese Language Movement
 Orunodoi

References

External links

 Hemkosh at journals.cambridge.org.

Scholars from Assam
People from Sivasagar district
Journalists from Assam
1836 births
1897 deaths
Indian social reformers
19th-century Indian linguists
Indian male writers
19th-century Indian male writers
Indian editors
19th-century Indian journalists